Dehri Assembly constituency is an assembly constituency in Rohtas district in the Indian state of Bihar. It is comes under Karakat lok sabha constituency. In 2020 Fateh Bahadur Singh of Rashtriya Janata Dal defeated Satyanarayan Singh of Bharatiya Janata Party to emerge victorious.

Members of Legislative Assembly

Election results

2020

References

External links
 

Assembly constituencies of Bihar